Regional Transit Authority may refer to:

Central Puget Sound Regional Transit Authority
Greater Cleveland Regional Transit Authority
Greater Dayton Regional Transit Authority
New Orleans Regional Transit Authority
Regional Transit Authority of Southeast Michigan
Regional Transportation Agency of Central Maryland
Southwest Ohio Regional Transit Authority

One of 15 Regional Transit Authorities in Massachusetts, including:
Cape Cod Regional Transit Authority
Montachusett Regional Transit Authority (MART)
Worcester Regional Transit Authority

See also
 Regional Transportation Authority (disambiguation)